See Parliament of Canada for an overall explanation of the functioning and composition of the Parliament of Canada
See Department of Canadian Heritage for an overall explanation of the responsibilities of the Department of Canadian Heritage

The objective of the Canadian Parliamentary Flag Program is to enable Canadian parliamentarians, from both Senate and House of Commons, to promote national symbols and to encourage Canadians to express pride in their symbols.

In December 1972, Cabinet approved a program under which senators and members of the House of Commons of Canada would receive flags and flag pins for distribution to constituents. An annual quota was established and the Canadian Parliamentary Flag Program went into effect on April 1, 1973.

Administration

In January each year the various government whips receive a letter from the Department of Canadian Heritage addressed to all members of parliament (MPs) and senators, explaining the Canadian Parliamentary Flag Program and the items to be included in the allotment.

Enclosed with this letter is a form which each parliamentarian must complete and then fax to the offices of the Department of Canadian Heritage in order to secure their allocation.

Allocation

Whilst a number of different items are included in the allocation, the type and quantity sent to each parliamentarian is fixed. MPs receive approximately twice the amount of promotional items as senators. The Department of Canadian Heritage sets aside a reserve in case an election is called, so that all new members of parliament would automatically receive an allotment package.

See also 
 Parliament of Canada 
 Department of Canadian Heritage
 Flag of Canada
 Maple Leaf
 National symbols of Canada
 Royal coat of arms of Canada

References

Canadian Heritage. "Administration of the Parliamentary Flag Program" (archived)
Nick Weekes, FFI. "Official Promotion of Flags and Flag Flying in Canada, Australia and New Zealand"

External links 
Flag of Canada Song (1965) Freddie Grant
 National Flag of Canada (Department of Canadian Heritage)
 George F.G. Stanley's Flag Memorandum, 23 March 1964
 Royal Proclamation
 Flag Etiquette in Canada
 
 CBC Digital Archives – The Great Canadian Flag Debate
 Canadian Flag Clip Art Gallery
 

National symbols of Canada